Sajan Tum Jhuth Mat Bollo! is an Indian television sitcom that aired on SAB TV channel in India. The series premiered on 25 February 2002; the series was also shown on TV Asia channel in the United States in 2006.

Concept
The story that revolves around all the three ‘Saajans’ (3 main guys) who lie to their father and family members at various points to escape from being caught. They all lie on various occasions to their ‘Sajanis’ (wife's) as well as to father, who is very confused himself.

References

External links
Official Site

Sony SAB original programming
Indian comedy television series
Indian television sitcoms